Nototherium ("Southern Beast") is an extinct genus of diprotodontid marsupial from Australia and New Guinea. This mammal had hypsodont molars and weighed around 500kg. It was a relative of the larger Diprotodon and a distant kin to modern wombats.

Species 

 Nototherium inerme Owen, 1845
 Nototherium watutense Anderson, 1937 (formerly considered to be a member of Kolopsis) Plio-Pleistocene, New Guinea.
 Nototherium mitchelli  Owen, 1845  Pleistocene, Australia (possibly a junior synonym of N. inerme)

References

 Wildlife of Gondwana: Dinosaurs and Other Vertebrates from the Ancient Supercontinent (Life of the Past) by Pat Vickers Rich, Thomas Hewitt Rich, Francesco Coffa, and Steven Morton
 Prehistoric Mammals of Australia and New Guinea: One Hundred Million Years of Evolution by John A. Long, Michael Archer, Timothy Flannery, and Suzanne Hand

Pleistocene marsupials
Pliocene marsupials
Prehistoric vombatiforms
Prehistoric mammals of Australia
Prehistoric marsupial genera
Fossil taxa described in 1845
Taxa named by Richard Owen